Split ring may refer to the following:

Engineering
Split-ring resonator is a unit which enhances magnetic permeability and magnetic coupling for metamaterials. 
Split-ring connector is a ring shaped type of timber connector that is in inserted in routed grooves between timber members in order to reduce stresses to the timbers at the connection points.
Commutator (electric), also called split rings.

General
A small keyring
Circle cotter, also known as a cotter ring, a formed wire fastener that is shaped like a circle, hence the name.